Boris Savović (Serbian Cyrillic: Борис Савовић; born June 18, 1987) is a Serbian-Montenegrin professional basketball player for Al-Muharraq of the Bahraini Premier League. Standing at 2.10 meters, he mainly features as a power forward or a center.

Professional career
Savović began his professional career in 2004 with Hemofarm. In September 2009, he signed a one-year deal with the Montenegrin team Budućnost Podgorica.

In September 2010, he returned to Hemofarm, signing a one-year deal with an option to extend his contract for one more year. During the 2011–12 season of the Adriatic League he averaged 12.8 points and 11.4 rebounds per game. In January 2012, he moved to Turkey and signed with Galatasaray Medical Park for the rest of the season.

On 26 July 2012 he signed a two-year deal with Crvena zvezda. With them he won the Radivoj Korać Cup in 2013. He left Zvezda after one season.

On 26 September 2013, he signed a one-year deal with the German Euroleague club Bayern Munich. In June 2014, he left Bayern after club decided to not re-signed him.

On 18 July 2014, he signed a one-year deal with ratiopharm Ulm. On 20 February 2015, he left Ulm and signed with Budućnost VOLI for the remainder of the season.

On 11 June 2015, he signed with the Turkish club Türk Telekom. On December 13, 2015, he parted ways with Türk Telekom after appearing in six league games and three FIBA Europe Cup games. On December 25, 2015, he signed with Mega Leks. On January 15, 2016, he left Mega and signed with Italian club Reyer Venezia Mestre for the rest of the season.

On 5 July 2016, Savović returned to Budućnost for the 2016–17 season.

On 14 July 2017, Savović signed with Polish club Stelmet Zielona Góra for the 2017–18 season.

On March 3, 2020, Savović has signed with Parma of the VTB United League. On September 4, 2021, Savović signed with BC Enisey. On January 5, 2022, he signed a short-term contract for Mega Mozzart. Later, he sign for Al-Muharraq of the Bahraini Premier League.

References

External links
 
 Boris Savović at aba-liga.com
 Boris Savović at euroleague.net
 Boris Savović at fiba.com

1987 births
Living people
ABA League players
Basketball League of Serbia players
Bosnia and Herzegovina expatriate basketball people in Serbia
BC Enisey players
Centers (basketball)
FC Bayern Munich basketball players
Galatasaray S.K. (men's basketball) players
Goyang Carrot Jumpers players
KK Budućnost players
KK Crvena zvezda players
KK Hemofarm players
KK Mega Basket players
Montenegrin men's basketball players
Parma Basket players
People from Trebinje
Power forwards (basketball)
Ratiopharm Ulm players
Reyer Venezia players
Serbian expatriate basketball people in Bahrain
Serbian expatriate basketball people in Germany
Serbian expatriate basketball people in Italy
Serbian expatriate basketball people in Montenegro
Serbian expatriate basketball people in Turkey
Serbian expatriate basketball people in Poland
Serbian expatriate basketball people in Russia
Serbian expatriate basketball people in South Korea
Serbian men's basketball players
Serbs of Bosnia and Herzegovina
Türk Telekom B.K. players